The Mississippi State Capitol or the “New Capitol,” has been the seat of the state’s government since it succeeded the old statehouse in 1903.  Located in Jackson, it was designated as a Mississippi Landmark in 1986, a National Historic Landmark in 2016 and added to the National Register of Historic Places in 1969.

The Capitol

History
After years of public debate, Governor Andrew Houston Longino, who took office in January 1900, convinced the Legislature it was time to construct a new Capitol and was appointed chairman of the State House Commission in February 1900 by the Legislature.

Fourteen architects submitted plans in response to the architectural contest advertised though newspapers in five cities across the country.  Bernard Green, the engineer who designed the Library of Congress, was hired by the State House Commission to review the submissions; he chose the plan of Theodore C. Link of St. Louis, Missouri.

Erected on the site of the old State Penitentiary, the Capitol was completed within 28 months in 1903 at a cost of $1,093,641.  Most fortuitously, rather than issuing bonds as was planned, the cost of the Capitol was paid in full at completion after the State of Mississippi was awarded one million dollars in a lawsuit settlement ordered by the U.S. Supreme Court for back taxes owed by the Illinois Central Railroad.

The Capitol originally housed all three branches of government. Currently, the Legislative Branch is the only full-time serving branch remaining.  The Supreme Court moved out in 1972 and is across the street in the Carroll Gartin Justice Building.  The main office of the Governor currently resides across the street in the Walter Sillers Building.

In 1933-34, a major painting program transformed the interior of the Capitol from its original white plaster ceilings to a much more colorful palette.  This project, funded by the Civil Works Administration and overseen by Jackson architect A. Hays Town, included artwork in the domes of the Rotunda and the Senate Chamber.

From 1979 through 1982, the Capitol underwent its most significant renovation.  During the $19 million project the Legislature met in Jackson’s old Central High School.  Mezzanines were installed in the second floor offices to increase the staff working area. The major public areas of the building, including the chambers of the House of Representatives, Senate, and old Supreme Court; Governor’s Reception Room; Rotunda; Hall of History; and United Daughters of the Confederacy Reception Room were restored.

Architecture/Building 
The Capitol exemplifies Beaux Arts classicism in architecture. 

The Capitol is 402 feet in width, 225 feet in depth, with a total of 171,000 square feet.  The central dome rises 180 feet above ground level.

The exterior walls of the Capitol are Indiana limestone and the base and stairs are Georgia granite. The drum of the main dome is a limestone-colored terra cotta and is surrounded by a limestone colonnade.  The eagle that stands atop is eight feet tall and 15 feet wide, made of copper, and gilded with gold leaf.

Inside the Capitol are more than ten types of marble from other states and countries and eight types of art marble, known as scagliola.  Architect Theodore Link used the new technology of electric lighting when designing the Capitol and incorporated 4,750 electric fixtures, which are still being used today. 

Windows of stained and leaded glass, crafted by Louis Millet of Chicago, Illinois, are original and adorn the grand staircase, domes and walls of the chambers of the Senate and House of Representatives, Governor’s Office, and other spaces within the building.  The ceilings of the third and fourth floor corridors contain Millet’s stained glass and work with the skylights on the roof and with the glass cylinders within the marble of the fourth floor as a skylight system to provide natural light along those corridors.

The ground floor’s Hall of Governors displays portraits of the former governors of Mississippi, beginning with the first territorial governor, Winthrop Sargent.

The main Rotunda is located on the second floor with walls of Italian white marble trimmed with Belgian black marble, cast iron balustrades with architectural motifs encircling the space, and the central dome rising above allowing in natural light to mix with the original electric light fixtures. A relief sculpture of Lady Justice is seen above each of the top arches.

The Rotunda also displays all the major classical orders, including Roman Doric on the first level (second floor), Ionic on the second level (third floor), and the highest order in the Composite capitals on the monumental columns. 

The second floor also houses the old Supreme Court and the old State Library.

In addition to the chambers of the Senate and the House of Representatives, the third floor is home to the offices of the Lieutenant Governor and the Speaker of the House, and the ceremonial office of the Governor. The Senate has 52 members.  The House of Representatives has 122 members.

The public galleries of the Senate and the House of Representatives are located on the fourth floor.

On top of the state capital building is a gold-plated American Bald Eagle figurine, facing south.

Hours 
The Capitol is open Monday-Friday, 8 a.m.-5 p.m. It is closed weekends.

Tours 
Guided tours are conducted free of charge by staff and volunteers. Tours are given Monday-Friday at 9:30 a.m. and 11 a.m. and 1 p.m. and 2:30 p.m., or visitors are welcome to do a self-guided tour anytime between 8 a.m.-5 p.m. Group and school tours are available by reservation.

Gift Shop 
The gift shop is open Monday-Friday, 9 a.m.-4 p.m. It is closed on weekends.

Popular Culture 

 Author John Grisham served as a member of the Mississippi House of Representatives from 1983-1990, during which time he wrote his first novel, A Time to Kill, and began writing his next, The Firm.
 The Capitol is featured in the following movies:
 The Chamber (1996)
 The Help (2011)

Gallery

The Old Capitol

See also

List of state and territorial capitols in the United States
List of governors of Mississippi
List of lieutenant governors of Mississippi

References

External links 
Mississippi State Capitol

Government of Mississippi
Government buildings on the National Register of Historic Places in Mississippi
State capitols in the United States
Tourist attractions in Jackson, Mississippi
Mississippi Landmarks
Government buildings with domes
National Register of Historic Places in Jackson, Mississippi
National Historic Landmarks in Mississippi
1901 establishments in Mississippi